Wrestling was one of the sports which was held at the 1994 Asian Games in Higashi-Hiroshima Sports Park, Hiroshima, Japan between 4 October and 10 October 1994. The competition included only men's events.

Medalists

Freestyle

Greco-Roman

Medal table

References
UWW Database
Results

 
1994 Asian Games events
1994
Asian Games
1994 Asian Games